Senator Cashman may refer to:

John E. Cashman (1865–1946), Wisconsin State Senate
Peter L. Cashman (born 1936), Connecticut State Senate